Saint Wolfeius was a hermit at St Benet Hulme in the English county of Norfolk.

He is known from the writings of William Worcester, who recorded him as the first hermit of St Benet Hulme.  He died, possibly sometime in the eleventh century, on 9 December which thus became his feast day.

References

Saints of Norfolk
11th-century Christian saints
Medieval English saints
English Roman Catholic saints
11th-century English people
English hermits